Garnet High School, also known as Garnet Career Center and Garnet Adult Education Center, is a historic African-American high school in Charleston, West Virginia. The school was established when "twelve African-American students in Kanawha County passed an entrance examination for high school level course work." It was named after Henry Highland Garnet, who was a former slave that became the United States’ ambassador to Liberia. It is a three-story, brick structure, constructed in 1928-29 from the plans of the prestigious Charleston architectural firm of Warne, Tucker, Silling and Hutchison, and dedicated December 2 to 4, 1929.  The façade features a limestone-arched entrance containing two sets of double doors, transom light, and a limestone tympanum. Garnet was one of three high schools in the Kanawha Valley built for African-American students. It closed as a high school in 1956, following integration of the public schools, but has been used as a public resource building since that time.

It was listed on the National Register of Historic Places in 1990.

Gallery

References

Buildings and structures in Charleston, West Virginia
Neoclassical architecture in West Virginia
Defunct schools in West Virginia
Educational institutions disestablished in 1956
Educational institutions established in 1929
Former school buildings in the United States
H. Rus Warne buildings
Historically segregated African-American schools in West Virginia
National Register of Historic Places in Charleston, West Virginia
1929 establishments in West Virginia
Schools in Kanawha County, West Virginia
School buildings on the National Register of Historic Places in West Virginia